Macklin Airport  is located  north-east of Macklin, Saskatchewan, Canada.

See also 
 List of airports in Saskatchewan

References 

Registered aerodromes in Saskatchewan
Eye Hill No. 382, Saskatchewan